This is a list of bestselling novels in the United States in the 1980s, as determined by Publishers Weekly. The list features the most popular novels of each year from 1980 through 1989.

The standards set for inclusion in the lists – which, for example, led to the exclusion of the novels in the Harry Potter series from the lists for the 1990s and 2000s – are currently unknown.

1980
 The Covenant by James A. Michener
 The Bourne Identity by Robert Ludlum
 Rage of Angels by Sidney Sheldon
 Princess Daisy by Judith Krantz
 Firestarter by Stephen King
 The Key to Rebecca by Ken Follett
 Random Winds by Belva Plain
 The Devil's Alternative by Frederick Forsyth
 The Fifth Horseman by Larry Collins and Dominique Lapierre
 The Spike by Arnaud de Borchgrave and Robert Moss

1981
 Noble House by James Clavell
 The Hotel New Hampshire by John Irving
 Cujo by Stephen King
 An Indecent Obsession by Colleen McCullough
 Gorky Park by Martin Cruz Smith
 Masquerade by Kit Williams
 Goodbye, Janette by Harold Robbins
 The Third Deadly Sin by Lawrence Sanders
 The Glitter Dome by Joseph Wambaugh
 No Time for Tears by Cynthia Freeman

1982
 E.T., The Extraterrestrial by William Kotzwinkle
 Space by James A. Michener
 The Parsifal Mosaic by Robert Ludlum
 Master of the Game by Sidney Sheldon
 Mistral's Daughter by Judith Krantz
 The Valley of Horses by Jean M. Auel
 Different Seasons by Stephen King
 North and South by John Jakes
 2010: Odyssey Two by Arthur C. Clarke
 The Man from St. Petersburg by Ken Follett

1983
 Return of the Jedi by James Kahn
 Poland by James A. Michener
 Pet Sematary by Stephen King
 The Little Drummer Girl by John le Carré
 Christine by Stephen King
 Changes by Danielle Steel
 The Name of the Rose by Umberto Eco
 White Gold Wielder by Stephen R. Donaldson
 Hollywood Wives by Jackie Collins
 The Lonesome Gods by Louis L'Amour

1984
 The Talisman by Stephen King and Peter Straub
 The Aquitaine Progression by Robert Ludlum
 The Sicilian by Mario Puzo
 Love and War by John Jakes
 The Butter Battle Book by Dr. Seuss
 "...And Ladies of the Club" by Helen Hooven Santmyer
 The Fourth Protocol by Frederick Forsyth
 Full Circle by Danielle Steel
 The Life and Hard Times of Heidi Abromowitz by Joan Rivers
 Lincoln by Gore Vidal

1985
 The Mammoth Hunters by Jean M. Auel
 Texas by James A. Michener
 Lake Wobegon Days by Garrison Keillor
 If Tomorrow Comes by Sidney Sheldon
 Skeleton Crew by Stephen King
 Secrets by Danielle Steel
 Contact by Carl Sagan
 Lucky by Jackie Collins
 Family Album by Danielle Steel
 Jubal Sackett by Louis L'Amour

1986
 It by Stephen King
 Red Storm Rising by Tom Clancy and Larry Bond
 Whirlwind by James Clavell
 The Bourne Supremacy by Robert Ludlum
 Hollywood Husbands by Jackie Collins
 Wanderlust by Danielle Steel
 I'll Take Manhattan by Judith Krantz
 Last of the Breed by Louis L'Amour
 The Prince of Tides by Pat Conroy
 A Perfect Spy by John le Carré

1987
 The Tommyknockers by Stephen King
 Patriot Games by Tom Clancy
 Kaleidoscope by Danielle Steel
 Misery by Stephen King
 Leaving Home by Garrison Keillor
 Windmills of the Gods by Sidney Sheldon
 Presumed Innocent by Scott Turow
 Fine Things by Danielle Steel
 Heaven and Hell by John Jakes
 The Eyes of the Dragon by Stephen King

1988
 The Cardinal of the Kremlin by Tom Clancy
 The Sands of Time by Sidney Sheldon
 Zoya by Danielle Steel
 The Icarus Agenda by Robert Ludlum
 Alaska by James A. Michener
 Till We Meet Again by Judith Krantz
 The Queen of the Damned by Anne Rice
 To Be the Best by Barbara Taylor Bradford
 One by Richard Bach
 Mitla Pass by Leon Uris

1989
 Clear and Present Danger by Tom Clancy
 The Dark Half by Stephen King
 Daddy by Danielle Steel
 Star by Danielle Steel
 Caribbean by James A. Michener
 The Satanic Verses by Salman Rushdie
 The Russia House by John le Carré
 The Pillars of the Earth by Ken Follett
 California Gold by John Jakes
 While My Pretty One Sleeps by Mary Higgins Clark

1980s in the United States
1980s books
Novels